Hastings Airport may refer to:

 Hastings Airport (Michigan) in Hastings, Michigan, United States
 Hastings Airport (Pasadena) in Pasadena, California, United States
 Hastings Airport (Sierra Leone) in Freetown, Sierra Leone
 Hastings Aerodrome in Hastings, Hawke's Bay, New Zealand
 Hastings Municipal Airport in Hastings, Nebraska, United States